Khevid-e Mobaraki (also Romanized as Khevīd-e Mobārakī) is a village in Ahmadabad Rural District, in the Central District of Firuzabad County, Fars Province, Iran. At the 2006 census, its population was 570, in 124 families.

References 

Populated places in Firuzabad County